Vicente Benavides Llanos (Quirihue, 1777 – Santiago, Chile, February 23, 1822) was a Chilean soldier who fought in the Chilean War of Independence. He is best known for leading Royalists guerrillas in La Frontera during the last years of the war.

Life as soldier

He initially sided with the patriots but changed sides later to side with the royalists. He then led the royalist bands during the so-called Guerra a muerte. This was a time of irregular warfare and Benavides got the aid of many Mapuche chiefs to combat the Chileans and pillage the countryside. He became known in this period for cruelty towards prisoners and breaking faith during truces. The Pincheira brothers, a future outlaw group, served Benavides in the Guerra a muerte by defending the Cordillera. 

In March 1821  was anchored at St Mary's when a boat belonging to Benavides captured her; she was later burnt in the Tubul River. Benavides had murdered her master, two mates, and part of her crew.

On 14 May Benevides seized the American merchant vessel , also at Santa Maria island, and later destroyed the vessel.

Execution
Benavides was captured near the end of the war. After a brief trial in Santiago, Benavides was hanged on 23 February 1822. His body was mutilated and dismembered, due to popular feeling against him.

In literature
The author Joseph Conrad modeled his character Gaspar Ruiz on Benavides. Conrad wrote "Gaspar Ruiz":  in 1904–5, published it in The Strand Magazine (1906), and again in A Set of Six (1908 (UK); 1915 (US)). This story was the only piece of Conrad's fiction ever adapted by the author for cinema, as Gaspar the Strong Man, 1920. Conrad found Benavides in Chapter 4 of Captain Basil Hall's 1824 book.

Citations and references
Citations

References

Conrad, Joseph (2011)  Joseph Conrad's Letters to R. B. Cunninghame Graham. (Cambridge University Press). 
Hall, Basil, (1824) Extracts from a Journal written on the Coasts of Chili, Peru, and Mexico, in the years 1820, 1821, 1822. (Edinburgh: Constable).

People of the Chilean War of Independence
Executed Chilean people
Spanish military personnel of the Chilean War of Independence
Royalists in the Hispanic American Revolution
Executed Spanish people
People executed by Chile by hanging
People from Itata Province
1777 births
1822 deaths
Chilean outlaws
Piracy in the Pacific Ocean
19th-century pirates
Spanish guerrillas